Gan Wee Teck (born 11 March 1972) is a Malaysian mathematician of Chinese descent, and Distinguished Professor of Mathematics at the National University of Singapore (NUS). He is known for his work on automorphic forms and representation theory in the context of the Langlands program, especially the theory of theta correspondence, the Gan–Gross–Prasad conjecture and the Langlands program for Brylinski–Deligne covering groups.

Biography
Though born in Malaysia, Gan grew up in Singapore and attended Pei Hwa Presbyterian Primary School, the Chinese High School, and Hwa Chong Junior College. He did his undergraduate studies at Churchill College, Cambridge University, followed by graduate studies at Harvard University, working under Benedict Gross and obtaining his Ph.D. in 1998. He was subsequently a faculty member at Princeton University (1998–2003) and University of California, San Diego (2003–2010) before moving to the National University of Singapore in 2010.

Contributions
With his collaborators, Gan has resolved several basic problems in the theory of theta correspondence (or Howe correspondence), such as the Howe duality conjecture and the Siegel–Weil formula.  He has also made contributions to the Gross–Prasad conjecture, the local Langlands correspondence and the representation theory of metaplectic groups.

Selected works

Children
 Ethan Gan: born on July 23, 2008 (currently attends  Singapore American School)

Awards and honours

 Senior Wrangler, University of Cambridge (1994)
 American Mathematical Society Centennial Fellowship (2002–2003) 
 Sloan Research Fellowship (Math, 2003) 
 Invited speaker at the International Congress of Mathematicians (ICM) in 2014 (Number Theory section) 
 President's Science Award 2017, Singapore
 Fellow of the Singapore National Academy of Science (2018)

References 

Living people
Malaysian mathematicians
Alumni of Churchill College, Cambridge
Harvard University alumni
Princeton University faculty
University of California, San Diego faculty
Academic staff of the National University of Singapore
1972 births
Chinese mathematicians
Malaysian people of Chinese descent
Malaysian expatriates in Singapore